Sonho Azul. Although in English language being "blue" refers to a sad feeling, in Brazilian culture, blue refers to a good sentiment, and the title track refers to someone dreaming about their loved one. This album consolidated Sandy & Junior as teen idols, selling over 750.000 copies.

The first single released was "Beijo É Bom". The marketing strategy of the album included the duo participating in the movie O Noviço Rebelde, a parody of the movie  The Sound of Music by famed brazilian comedian Renato Aragão. In the movie, Sandy & Junior play two siblings that dream about becoming singers. During the movie, they sing several songs, including a music video of "Beijo É Bom" at Water Park in Fortaleza.

The second single, "Inesquecível", was a version of Laura Pausini's "Incancellabile", and got a music video. The third single, "Eu Acho Que Pirei", named the tour that followed the album, which also became their first live record. The instrumental section of the song also became the intro of the duo's TV series aired at TV Globo.

The song "Ilusão" became a fan-favorite, although it was not a single. It was the song chosen by the fans to be included in the duo's last live concert.

Besides "Inesquecível", as in their previous records, the duo sang versions of famous international songs, like "Como Eu Te Amo", originally I Will Always Love You, most famously sang by Whitney Houston. Another one Pot-pourri Bee Gee, a mix of three Bee Gees songs: "Mais Que Uma Sombra" (More Than a Woman (Bee Gees song), "Troque a Pilha" Night Fever and "Esteja no Ar" Stayin' Alive. They also sang a cover of singer and composer Erasmo Carlos, "Pega na Mentira".

In 1998, a new version of the album was released, with a new song: "Era Uma Vez...". It was the opening of a soap opera with the same name, and the duo sang with the famous singer and composer Toquinho.

Track listing

References

Sandy & Junior albums
1997 albums
Dance-pop albums by Brazilian artists
Portuguese-language albums